Tarentum is a borough in Allegheny County in the U.S. state of Pennsylvania. Tarentum was an industrial center where plate glass and bottles were manufactured; bricks, lumber, steel and iron novelties, steel billets and sheets, sack and wrapping paper were also produced.

The Pennsylvania Railroad operated a station in Tarentum; its rail line ran through the town. The population was 4,352 at the 2020 census. Two statues of Hebe, the Greek goddess of youth, are displayed by the borough in Tarentum.

Geography
Tarentum is located at  (40.603042, -79.755447).

Streams
 The Allegheny River forms the borough's eastern border with Westmoreland County.
 Bull Creek joins the Allegheny River at Tarentum.
 Little Bull Creek joins Bull Creek via a culvert underneath Bull Creek Road (Pennsylvania Route 366) at Tarentum.

Neighboring municipalities
Tarentum is bordered by East Deer Township to the west, Frazer Township to the northwest, Fawn Township to the north, Harrison Township to the northeast, and Brackenridge to the east. To the southeast, across the Allegheny River in Westmoreland County, are New Kensington (via Tarentum Bridge) and Lower Burrell.

Demographics

As of the census of 2000, there were 4,993 people, 2,170 households, and 1,306 families residing in the borough. The population density was 4,011.0 people per square mile (1,554.7/km2). There were 2,556 housing units at an average density of 2,053.3 per square mile (795.9/km2). The racial makeup of the borough was 93.79% White, 3.65% African American, 0.28% Native American, 0.60% Asian, 0.04% Pacific Islander, 0.26% from other races, and 1.38% from two or more races. Hispanic or Latino of any race were 0.90% of the population.

There were 2,170 households, out of which 26.6% had children under the age of 18 living with them, 41.0% were married couples living together, 14.0% had a female householder with no husband present, and 39.8% were non-families. 34.2% of all households were made up of individuals, and 13.2% had someone living alone who was 65 years of age or older. The average household size was 2.28 and the average family size was 2.92.

In the borough the population was spread out, with 22.0% under the age of 18, 8.8% from 18 to 24, 31.5% from 25 to 44, 22.0% from 45 to 64, and 15.8% who were 65 years of age or older. The median age was 38 years. For every 100 females there were 88.1 males. For every 100 females age 18 and over, there were 85.8 males.

The median income for a household in the borough was $26,895, and the median income for a family was $32,042. Males had a median income of $28,578 versus $21,891 for females. The per capita income for the borough was $14,671. About 12.1% of families and 15.6% of the population were below the poverty line, including 24.1% of those under age 18 and 7.3% of those age 65 or over.

In 1900, 5,472 people lived here; in 1910, 7,414 people lived here; and in 1940, 9,846 people lived in Tarentum. The population was 4,993 at the 2000 census.

Museums and other points of interest

 The Community Library of Allegheny Valley, Tarentum Branch, serves the borough and regional municipalities.
 Allegheny-Kiski Valley Heritage Museum is at 224 East Seventh Avenue.http://www.akvhs.org/
 Pittsburgh Mills in nearby Frazer Township uses a Tarentum postal code; it is the 22nd-largest shopping mall in the United States.

Education
Tarentum is within the Highlands School District, which operates Grandview Upper Elementary School (grades 3–4) in the borough; also Fawn and Fairmount primary centers (grades K–2), Highlands Middle School (grades 5–8), and Highlands High School (grades 9–12) in nearby communities. The Golden Rams are the Highlands School District's mascot.

Government and politics

Usage in popular culture

 Knightriders – (1981)
 Out of the Black – (2001)
 My Bloody Valentine 3D – (2009)

Notable people
 Martin Chartier, a French-Canadian fur trader who established a trading post in 1694 with his son, Peter Chartier, in what is now Tarentum.
 John Filo, photographer, took award-winning Kent State photo while employed in Tarentum.
 John Baptiste Ford, industrialist and founder of the Pittsburgh Plate Glass Company, now known as PPG Industries.
 John Grant, writer for Abbott and Costello.
 Estelle Harris, actress who played George Costanza's mother on Seinfeld'', lived in Tarentum and graduated from the former Tarentum High School.
 Samuel Kier, pioneer oil refiner, operated salt wells in Tarentum.
 Evelyn Nesbit, artists' model and chorus girl, pursued by architect Stanford White and murderer Harry Thaw; she married the latter.

References

External links
 Borough of Tarentum official website

Populated places established in 1829
Pittsburgh metropolitan area
Boroughs in Allegheny County, Pennsylvania
1842 establishments in Pennsylvania